Gnathochromis is a small genus of cichlid fish endemic to the Lake Tanganyika basin in East Africa.

The two species are distantly related (G. permaxillaris close to other limnochromines; G. pfefferi close to the tropheines) and as presently defined Gnathochromis is polyphyletic.

Species
There are currently two recognized species in this genus:
 Gnathochromis permaxillaris (L. R. David, 1936)
 Gnathochromis pfefferi (Boulenger, 1898)

References

 
Limnochromini
Fish of Africa
Cichlid genera
Taxa named by Max Poll